Iniopteryx ("Nape Wing") is an extinct genus of cartilaginous fish. It is from the Pennsylvanian epoch of the Carboniferous period, approximately 300 million years ago. Their fossils have been found in North America, primarily in two states: Ohio and Montana. In general, very little is known about this species.

Characteristics
Iniopteryx was a chimaera-like fish, described as "plump". It is known that the species average size was around half a meter long in length. While the species had specialized spines and fins superficially similar to that of a flying fish, there is much speculation about whether it could glide like a flying fish, or was actually benthic.

References

 Vertebrate Palaeontology by Michael J. Benton

External links

Iniopterygiformes